X-Frame may also refer to:

 X-cross (BDSM), a restraint device
 A type of vehicle frame
 a Smith & Wesson revolver frame size

See also
Frame (disambiguation)